A robotic vacuum cleaner, sometimes called a robovac or a roomba as a generic trademark, is an autonomous robotic vacuum cleaner which has a limited vacuum floor cleaning system combined with sensors and robotic drives with programmable controllers and cleaning routines. Early designs included manual operation via remote control and a "self-drive" mode which allowed the machine to clean autonomously. Some designs use spinning brushes to reach tight corners, and some include a number of cleaning features along with the vacuuming feature (mopping, UV sterilization, etc.). More recent models use artificial intelligence and deep learning for better mapping, object identification and event-based cleaning.

Marketing materials for robotic vacuums frequently cite low noise, ease of use, and autonomous cleaning as main advantages. The perception that these devices are set-and-forget solutions is widespread but not always correct. Robotic vacuums are usually smaller than traditional upright vacuums, and weigh significantly less than even the lightest canister models. However, a downside to a robotic vacuum cleaner is that it takes an extended amount of time to vacuum an area due to its size. They are also relatively expensive, and replacement parts and batteries can contribute significantly to their operating cost.

History

In 1956, the American science fiction author Robert A. Heinlein described the concept of a robotic vacuum cleaner with a recharging dock in his novel The Door into Summer: "Basically it was just a better vacuum cleaner .... It went quietly looking for dirt all day long, in search curves that could miss nothing .... Around dinner time it would go to its stall and soak up a quick charge."

In 1969 on 2 April an episode of The Avengers was broadcast in which the character Inge Tilson played by Dora Reisser says "...I saw a demonstration once. A robot vacuum cleaner. It swept around the house, went back into its cupboard, automatically plugged in and recharged itself...". The teleplay for this episode which was entitled "Thingumajig" was written by Terry Nation. It was episode 27 of Season 7.

In 1985, Tomy released the Dustbot as a part of their Omnibot line of toys. Dustbot was the first robot to feature a built in vacuum, and was able to turn when it sensed an edge or ran into something. Dustbot would carry a mini broom and dustpan for decoration.

In 1990, three roboticists, Colin Angle, Helen Greiner, and Rodney Brooks, founded iRobot. It was originally dedicated to making robots for military and domestic use. It launched the Roomba in 2002, which was able to change direction when it encountered an obstacle, detect dirty spots on the floor, and identify steep drops to keep it from falling down stairs. The Roomba proved to be the first commercially successful robot vacuum. In 2005, iRobot introduced the Scooba, which scrubbed hard floors.

In 1996, Electrolux introduced the first robotic vacuum cleaner, the Electrolux Trilobite. It worked well but had frequent problems with colliding with objects and stopping short of walls and other objects, as well as leaving small areas not cleaned. As a result, it failed in the market and was discontinued. In 1997, one of Electrolux's first versions of the Trilobite vacuum was featured on the BBC's science program, Tomorrow's World.

In 2001, Dyson built and demonstrated a robot vacuum known as the DC06. However, due to its high price, it was never released to the market. Electrolux released the Trilobite robotic vacuum cleaner. The Robotic vacuum cleaner launched at a price of $1,800.00. There were two models: the ZA1 and the ZA2.

In 2010, the Neato Robotics XV-11 robotic vacuum introduced laser-based mapping, allowing navigation in straight lines rather than the traditional random navigation.

In 2015, Dyson and iRobot both introduced camera-based mapping.

In 2016, iRobot CEO claimed that 20% of vacuum cleaners sales worldwide were robots.

As of 2018, obstacles such as dog feces, cables and shoes remain very difficult for robots to navigate around.

In 2022, ECOVACS launched DEEBOT-X1 Family featuring YIKO Voice Assistant, which was the industry's first natural language for home robots with Al voice interaction and control technologies.

Main features

Cleaning modes

Robotic vacuums have different types of cleaning modes, usually including the following:
 Auto: This mode is helpful for general cleaning. Typically, the mode cleans a space until the battery runs out.
 Spot: with the help of this mode, the vacuum focuses on a particular dirty zone.
 Turbo: This mode is used to clean and pick up the most dirt and dust, but it may create noise.
 Edge: This mode helps to clean edges and corners.
 Quiet: The mode helps to reduce noise levels while cleaning. It is helpful when the user is at home.
 Remote control: It allows the user to control the direction of the vacuum.

Wet mopping 
Some models can also mop for wet cleaning, autonomously vacuuming and wet-mopping a floor in one pass (sweep and mop combo).

The mop is either manually wet before attachment to the bottom of the robot or the robot may be able to automatically spray water on to the floor before running over it. 

Some advanced robot vacuum cleaners have a sensor that detects and avoids mopping in carpeted areas. However, if there is no sensor, most of the robot vacuum cleaner manufacturers add a no-mop zone feature in the app to make robot vacuums to avoid certain areas to clean.

A robot mop can tackle multiple surfaces and comes with a variety of different cleaning modes, providing options for sweeping, vacuuming and mopping damp or wet floors. Robot mops score better on hard surfaces and are ideally suited for hardwood, laminate and tile flooring types.

Mapping

The first robovacs used random navigation. This sometimes caused the unit to miss spots when cleaning or be unable to locate its base station to recharge, and did not provide the user a history of which spaces were cleaned.

More sophisticated models include mapping ability. The unit can use gyro-, camera-, radar-, and laser- (laser distance sensor or LDS) guided systems to create a floor plan, which can be permanently stored for more efficiency, and updated with information on areas which have been (or have not been) cleaned. Thus, the cleaning efficiency is greatly improved and the repetition rate is reduced significantly.

Models with a multiple floor plan feature can store several floor plans.

Others

Anti-drop Most robots include anti-drop and anti-bump IR sensors.
Anti-winding When approaching obstacles, the robot vacuum cleaner will automatically turn away.
Anti-tangle Prevents the robot vacuum cleaner from becoming tangled in cables.
Virtual no-go lines Virtual no-go lines set boundaries to restrict the unit's movements to desired cleaning areas.
Regular charge time is five to six hours. Quick recharge allows the unit to calculate the shortest way to recharge (shortcut path) and charge only as much as needed, so it finishes more quickly (automatic cleaning resumption).
Schedule Scheduled daily cleaning. All-Timetable means a full week of different daily schedules can be programmed.
Connected app Some models allow control of the unit using an app over a WiFi connection from the user's smartphone or connected home automation device, e.g. Amazon Alexa and the Google Assistant.
Software upgrades Some units are able to receive over-the-air (OTA) firmware updates.
HEPA filters HEPA air filters are industry-standard now for robot vacuum cleaners. These remove dust and pollen from the air.

List of robotic vacuum cleaners 

 Electrolux Trilobite – 1996. Named for its appearance, basic functionality and mild functional success. Introduced the public to the concept. Discontinued.
 LG Roboking – launched in 2001
 Dyson DC06 – 2001. Deemed too expensive; not released.
 iRobot Roomba – 2002. Basic features on this early iRobot model succeeded in defining the retail category in America. 
 Kärcher RC3000 and RC4000 – sold from 2002 to 2015
 Friendly Vac RV400 – 2004, from Hoover and Friendly Robotics (Robomow); discontinued
 Koolvac – all U.S. models destroyed in 2005 due to a successful patent infringement lawsuit by iRobot
 Ecovacs Robotics Deebot series – introduced in 2007
 iRobot Pet Series – 2008. 
 Dustbot – prototype for street cleanup, 2010
 Neato Robotics XV-11 – 2010. The Neato had average specifications for its time but implemented a laser mapping system.
 iRobot Roomba 980 – 2015. iRobot implemented camera mapping, a WiFi module, and a smartphone app.
 Dyson 360Eye – 2015. Marketed as Dyson's first robotic vacuum, this model included camera-based obstacle detection and room mapping.
 iRobot Roomba i7 Plus with Clean Base – 2018. The iRobot consumer lineup now self-empties, docks, and charges, enabling continuous cleaning.
 SharkNinja AI, IQ, and ION Robot Vacuums.

Open-source designs
These are open-source designs that can be built using off-the-shelf components and 3D printed parts.
MARK II – released 2019
Cesnietor VacuumRobot – released 2017

See also

 Automated pool cleaner
 Comparison of domestic robots
 Domestic robots
 List of vacuum cleaners
 Mobile robot
 Open-source robotics
 Robotic mapping
 Wireless sensor network

References

External links

Cleaning
Home automation